The Ministry of Science and Higher Education of the Russian Federation is a ministry established in May 2018 as a result of splitting the Ministry of Education and Science, which existed from March 2004, into two separate agencies. The second simultaneously emerged agency is the Ministry of Education sometimes called "of General Education" or "of Enlightenment". The Ministry of Science and Higher Education is responsible for a state control over the scientific institutions and the university-level education in the Russian Federation. Particularly, all institutes of the Russian Academy of Sciences are now under jurisdiction of this Ministry. It is headquartered in Moscow. Mikhail Kotyukov was appointed as the first Minister. Since January 21, 2020, the Ministry is headed by Valery Falkov.

References

Education in Russia
Education
Russia
Russia, Education